R. Chinnaswamy is an Indian politician and was a member of the Tamil Nadu Legislative Assembly from the Singanallur constituency in Tamil Nadu.

Chiinaswamy, who represents to All India Anna Dravida Munnetra Kazhagam party, was elected to the Tamil Nadu Legislative Assembly from Singanallur in the 2006 elections and those of 2011.

The elections of 2016 resulted in his constituency being won by N. Karthik.

References 

Tamil Nadu MLAs 2006–2011
Tamil Nadu MLAs 2011–2016
All India Anna Dravida Munnetra Kazhagam politicians
Living people
Year of birth missing (living people)